Acousticity is an album by American musician David Grisman, released in 1984.

Track listing 
All compositions by David Grisman unless otherwise noted.
 "Acousticity" – 4:11
 "Dancin'" (Grisman, Jim Buchanan) – 4:22
 "Brazilian Breeze" – 4:29
 "Blue Sky Bop" (Rob Wasserman) – 4:49
 "Dawgalypso (The Island Song)" – 3:45
 "Tango for Django" – 3:04
 "Richochet" (Grisman, R. Somers) – 2:18
 "Newmonia" – 6:24
 "Pamela" – 2:54

Personnel 
 David Grisman – mandolin, mandola
 Hal Blaine – drums, percussion
 Jim Buchanan – violin, whistle
 Rob Wasserman – bass
 Jon Sholle – guitar
 Bob Doll – trumpet
 Ron Taormina – saxophone
 Pee Wee Ellis – saxophone
 Richard Greene – violin
 Joy Lyle – violin
 Sid Sharp – violin
 Jesse Ehrlich – cello
Production notes:
 David Grisman – producer
 Greg Fulginiti – mastering

Chart positions

References 

1984 albums
David Grisman albums